Maxwellisation is the legal practice in English and Scots law that allows persons who are to be criticised in an official report to respond prior to publication, based on details of the criticism received in advance.

The process takes its name from the publisher Robert Maxwell. In 1969, Maxwell was criticised in a report by the Department of Trade and Industry as "unfit to hold the stewardship of a public company". Maxwell took the matter to court, where the DTI was said by the judge to have "virtually committed the business murder" of Maxwell.

To avoid any repeat following Mr Justice Forbes' ruling, official policy was altered to ensure prior notice would be given of critical findings. Relevant witnesses are shown the specific extracts of reports relating to them.

Many examples exist of the process being applied, including the 1997 report into the Guinness share-trading fraud and the Iraq Inquiry.

References

Legal doctrines and principles
English civil law
Government reports
Scots civil law
Robert Maxwell